James Pattison (1786 – 14 July 1849) was a Liberal Party politician in England. He sat in the House of Commons between 1835 and 1849.

A member of the Worshipful Company of Spectacle Makers, he was elected at the 1835 general election as one of the four Members of Parliament (MPs) for the City of London, and re-elected in 1837, but defeated at the 1841 general election. He was returned to the Commons two years later, for the same constituency, when he won a by-election in October 1843 following the death of the long-serving Liberal MP Sir Matthew Wood, Bt. He was re-elected in 1847, and held the seat until his death in July 1849, aged 63, at Molesey Grove, near Hampton Court.

References

External links 

1794 births
1849 deaths
Liberal Party (UK) MPs for English constituencies
UK MPs 1835–1837
UK MPs 1837–1841
UK MPs 1841–1847
Worshipful Company of Spectacle Makers